Geirr Tveitt (born Nils Tveit; 19 October 1908 – 1 February 1981) was a Norwegian composer and pianist. Tveitt was a central figure of the national movement in Norwegian cultural life during the 1930s.

Life

Early years
Tveitt was born in Bergen, where his father briefly worked as a teacher. His parents were Håkonson Lars Tveit (1878–1951) and Johanna Nilsdotter Heradstveit (1882–1966). His family were of farmer stock, and still retained Tveit, their ancestral land in Kvam – a secluded village on the scenic Hardangerfjord. The Tveit family would relocate to Drammen in the winter to work, but return to Hardanger in the summer to farm. Thus Tveitt enjoyed both a countryside existence and city life. Tveitt had originally been christened Nils, but following his increasing interest in Norwegian heritage, he thought the name 'not Norwegian enough' and changed it to Geir. He later added an extra r to his first name and an extra t to Tveit to indicate more clearly to non-Norwegians the desired pronunciation of his name. It was during his childhood summers in Hardanger that Tveitt gained knowledge of the rich folk-music traditions of the area. Historically, Hardanger's relative isolation allowed for the development of a unique musical culture, with which Tveitt became infatuated. Tveitt was no child prodigy, but discovered that he possessed musical talent, and learned to play both the violin and the piano. And, after having been encouraged by Norwegian composer Christian Sinding, Tveitt decided to try his hand at writing music.

Leipzig
In 1928 Tveitt left Norway to be educated. He headed for Germany – to Leipzig and its Conservatory, which had been the hub of European musical learning and culture for so long. It was an intense time for Tveitt. He studied composition with Hermann Grabner and Leopold Wenninger, and the piano with Otto Weinreich, making extraordinary progress in both fields. The joy of learning from some of the best German educators of the time was often overshadowed by his almost chronic lack of funds – Tveitt having to rely upon translation work and donations to support himself. The Norwegian composer David Monrad Johansen  through the student years. Perhaps it was the expatriation from Norway that kindled in Tveitt a strong desire to embrace completely his Norwegian heritage. Tveitt's profound interest in the modal scales (which forms the basis of the folk-music of many countries) often tested Grabner's patience. However, the latter must have felt great pride when Tveitt had his 12 Two-part Inventions in Lydian, Dorian and Phrygian accepted for publishing by Breitkopf & Hartel in 1930. The following year the Leipzig Radio Orchestra premiered Tveitt's first Piano Concerto – a composition that reflects Tveitt's search for an individual and Norwegian voice.

European studies and touring
In 1932 Tveitt headed on to Paris. Tveitt had become increasingly frustrated with the teaching in Leipzig, but found a new freedom and inspiration. Here he obtained lessons from some of the greatest and most well-known composers of the times: Arthur Honegger and Heitor Villa-Lobos both agreed to see Tveitt. He further managed to enroll in the classes of Nadia Boulanger. Tveitt also made a visit to Vienna, where he was able to study for some time with Austrian composer Egon J. Wellesz, a former pupil of Arnold Schoenberg. Tveitt made one last educational stopover in Paris in 1938 before heading home to Norway to work. Compared to other Norwegian composers contemporary with Tveitt, he had perhaps the most diverse education – and he had already started to make a name for himself. His writings and compositions made quite a stir amongst the establishment in Oslo. In the years leading up to World War II, Tveitt derived most of his income working as music critic to Sjofartstidende (The Naval Times). Tveitt's highly opinionated reviews contributed to his securing strong opponents – one of these were the Norwegian composer, Pauline Hall.  Tveitt focused his energies on composing. As soon as the Second World War had ended, Tveitt brought his scores with him to Europe, touring extensively – often performing own piano works with similar works by other composers, i.e. Grieg and Chopin. Many of the concerts were great personal and artistic successes for the Norwegian composer, and especially so the 1947 concert in Paris. Here Tveitt premiered his Piano Sonatas nos 1 and 29, some of his adaptations of Hardanger Folk-Songs and also the Fourth Concerto for Piano and Orchestra – Aurora Borealis. The piano concerto was performed in a two-piano version, Tveitt assisted by the French pianist Genevieve Joy. According to reviews, the concerto had thrown the Parisian audience into a paroxysm of ecstasy. Tveitt's intense, glittering, French-Impressionist flavoured rendition of the dancing and mystical northern winter sky, earned him the acclaim of his former teacher Nadia Boulanger in her following review.

Later years and death
In spite of Tveitt's glorious successes internationally, the contemporary Norwegian establishment remained aloof. Following the upheaval of the Second World War, anything that resembled nationalism or purism was quickly disdained by the Establishment. Tveitt's aesthetic and music were fundamentally unfashionable. Tveitt struggled financially and became increasingly isolated. He spent more and more time at the family farm in Kvam, keeping his music to himself – all manuscripts neatly filed in wooden chests. The catastrophe could therefore hardly have been any worse when his house burned to the ground in 1970. Tveitt despaired – the original manuscripts to almost 300 opuses (including six piano concertos and two concertos for Hardanger fiddle and orchestra) were reduced to singed bricks of paper – deformed and inseparable. The Norwegian Music Information Centre agreed to archive the remains, but the reality was that 4/5 of Tveitt's production was gone. Tveitt now found it very difficult to compose and gradually succumbed to alcoholism. Several commentators imagine that his many hardships contributed to these conditions. Tveitt died in Norheimsund, Hardanger, reduced and largely embittered, with little hope for the legacy of his professional work.

Controversy
One of the most controversial areas of Tveitt's career is his affiliation with the so-called Neo-Heathenistic movement, which centered around the Norwegian philosopher Hans S. Jacobsen (1901–1980) in the 1930s in Oslo. This is a topic that frequently returns in Norwegian public debate. Jacobsen's main thesis, inspired by the theories of the German theologist Jakob Wilhelm Hauer, was the total refutation of Christianity in favour of a new heathen system based upon Norse mythology and the Edda poetry. The movement rejected Christianity and sought to re-introduce the Norse pre-Christian system of belief – the adoration of Odin, Thor and Balder. Jacobsen later became a member of Nasjonal Samling ('National Assembly'), which led the interim, pro-Hitler puppet government during the German occupation of Norway. Even though Geirr Tveitt displayed a deep interest in the theories of the movement, he never enrolled as a member of Nasjonal Samling. His preoccupation with Jacobsen's thinking however, materialised in conspicuous ways; for example Tveitt invented his own non-Christian timeline based upon the arrival of Leif Erikson in what is now Canada. Traces of Antisemitism are often found in his correspondence from the 1930s. The Neo-Heathen system of thought found its way into Tveitt's music; his perhaps most intensely such composition is the ballet Baldur's Dreams. In it, one could argue, Tveitt seeks to establish a link between this world – its creation, cycle and dwellers – and the eternal battle between the benevolent heathen Norse gods and their opponents, the evil jotuns. Tveitt began work on the ballet whilst studying in Leipzig, where it was first performed on 24 February 1938. There Baldur's Dreams became a remarkable success, and performances were later given in Berlin, Tübingen, Bergen and Oslo.

Another result of Tveitt's Norse purism was his development of the theory that the modal scales originally were Norwegian, renaming them in honor of Norse gods. He also developed an intricate diatonic theory, which interconnected the modal scales through a system of double leading notes. These ideas were published in his 1937 argument Tonalitätstheorie des parallellen Leittonsystems. Even though most musicologists agree that Tveitt's theories are colored by his personal convictions – his thesis is intelligent, challenging and thought-provoking.

The issue of Tveitt's inglorious relationship with so-called 'nazi-ideologies' is so delicate that most scholars have avoided it altogether. Some commentators have noticed that one of the foremost Norwegian authorities on Tveitt, Hallgjerd Aksnes, Professor of Music at the University of Oslo, did not address this question in her article on Tveitt in Grove Dictionary of Music and Musicians. Tveitt's connection to far-right German thinking is perhaps a question scholars will return to as the world understands the dynamics of a troubled period in European history more fully. For Tveitt, the question proved devastating to his reputation, and contributed significantly to his becoming a persona-non-grata in the post-war musical establishment in Norway. However, as the most traumatic years of European history become more distant, a new generation of academics and musicians are approaching Tveitt and his music. Most of Tveitt's remaining music is now commercially available on records.

Music

Stylistic origins
His music draws from many styles and traditions, most notably the barbarism of Stravinsky's early ballets, the unique rhythms and textures of Bartók's music and the floating and mystic moods of Debussy and Ravel's music – always underpinned by idioms derived from Norwegian folk-music. Very few of Tveitt's works had been published or properly archived at institutions – aggravating the effects of the 1970 fire. Tveitt himself made visits to universities across Norway, and wrote to friends, asking for spare copies and parts – but little was found. However, over the years, copies of several scores have been recovered; others have been reconstructed from orchestral parts, as well as radio and magnetic tape recordings.

Hardanger folk music
Tveitt's perhaps greatest musical project was the collection and adaptation of traditional folk melodies from the Hardanger district. Many composers and musicologists (including Norway's internationally recognised Edvard Grieg) had successfully researched and collected the music of Hardanger long before Tveitt. However, from 1940 onwards, when Tveitt settled permanently in Hardanger, he became one of the locals, and spent much time working and playing with folk-musicians. He thus happened upon a treasure of unknown tunes, claiming to have discovered almost one thousand melodies, and incorporated one hundred of these into his work list; Fifty folktunes from Hardanger for piano op. 150, and A Hundred Hardanger Tunes op. 151. Musicologist David Gallagher might speak for many when he suggests that in these two opuses – their universe, music and history – are found the very best of Tveitt's qualities as a composer. The tunes reflect both profound (in fact) Christian values and a parallel universe dominated by the mysticism of nature itself and not only the worldly, but also nether worldly creatures that inhabit it – according to traditional folklore. The major part of the tunes is directly concerned with Hardanger life, which Tveitt was a part of. In his adaptations, therefore, he sought to bring forth not only the melody itself, but also the atmosphere, mood and scenery in which it belonged. Tveitt utilised his profound knowledge of traditional and avant-garde use of harmony and instruments when he scored the tunes – achieving an individual and recognisable texture. Copies of the piano versions and orchestral suites nos 1, 2, 4 and 5 were elsewhere during that tragic fire in 1970, so these works survive. Norwegian musicologists hope that suite nos 3 and 6 might be restored from the burned-out remnants held at the archives in Oslo.

Legacy in Norway
Tveitt's works remained largely misunderstood and unappreciated by his contemporary Norwegian musical establishment. However, Tveitt won the hearts of a whole nation with his radio programmes on folk music at the Norwegian National Broadcasting (NRK) in the 1960s and '70s. Tveitt worked as Assistant Producer to the radio, where he also premiered numerous songs written to texts by respected and well-known Norwegian poets like Knut Hamsun, Arnulf Overland, Aslaug Vaa and Herman Wildenvey. Many Norwegians remember perhaps Tveitt most fondly for his tune to Aslaug Låstad Lygre's poem We should not sleep in summer nights. In 1980 Tveitt was awarded the Lindeman prize for the work he had done through the NRK. He also set songs by Aslaug Vaa and Olav H. Hauge.

Recordings and research
Today Norway is seeing the advent of a new generation of musicians and musicologists, who seem to be primarily concerned with Tveitt's music and not so much with the controversies he inspired. Starting in the late 1990s the Norwegian government began to provide some funding for the examination and preservation of the remains of Tveitt's scores, and several startling discoveries have been made. Thought to have been lost for all time, Baldur's Dreams appeared amongst the damaged manuscripts, and its fate is illustrative. Tveitt made numerous versions of the ballet – in Paris he presented a reworked score Dances from Baldur's Dreams. Tveitt then sent it to the choreographer Serge Lifar in London, where the score allegedly was lost in the Blitz.

However, after the singed manuscripts held at the NMIC were examined in 1999, it became apparent that Tveitt indeed had a copy of the 1938 original score – and through tedious restoration work by Norwegian composer Kaare Dyvik Husby and Russian composer Alexej Rybnikov from the singed manuscripts, recording, and a piano version, the ballet literally rose from the ashes. It is now available on BIS-CD-1337/1338, where Ole Kristian Ruud conducts the Stavanger Symphony Orchestra. A TV documentary program Baldur's Dreams on the incredible fate of the ballet, was broadcast in Norway on 15 June 2008 and attracted nationwide interest.

Another reconstruction project worth mentioning is the reconstruction of the solo piano piece Morild. The title alludes to the mysterious phenomenon of phosphorescence of the sea, and it was amongst the treasures lost in the 1970 fire. Fortunately, a recording of the work made by Tveitt for French national radio in 1952 has survived. It was issued for the first time on Simax in 1994. A reconstruction of the score was undertaken by the American transcription specialist Chris Eric Jensen in 2005 in collaboration with the pianist Håvard Gimse who gave the piece its first performance on Tveitt's 100th birthday on 19 October 2008, the first time it had been played by a pianist other than the composer.

Selected works

Many of Tveitt's scores are published by the Norwegian Music Information Centre, as well as through the archives of the Society of Norwegian Composers.

Stage
 Baldur's Dreams, ballet
 Dragaredokko, opera
 Jeppe, opera

Concertante
 Piano
 Piano Concerto No. 1 in F major, Op. 5 (1927)
 Piano Concerto No. 2 in E-flat major 'Hommage to Ravel'
 Piano Concerto No. 3 'Hommage to Brahms'
 Piano Concerto No. 4 'Aurora Borealis' (Nordljus / Northern Lights) (piano part reconstructed from full orchestral parts, a two-piano reduction, and a recording)
 Piano Concerto No. 5, Op. 156 (1954)
 Variations on a Folk song from Hardanger, for two pianos and orchestra (1949)
 Hardanger fiddle
 Hardanger Fiddle Concerto No. 1
 Hardanger Fiddle Concerto No. 2 Three Fjords
 Harp
 Harp Concerto No. 2

Orchestral
 A Hundred Hardanger Tunes, Op. 151 – Suite No. 1
 A Hundred Hardanger Tunes, Op. 151 – Suite No. 2
 A Hundred Hardanger Tunes, Op. 151 – Suite No. 4
 A Hundred Hardanger Tunes, Op. 151 – Suite No. 5  
 Nykken (The Water Sprite), symphonic poem for large orchestra
 Prillar
 Sun God Symphony for orchestra (abridged version of Baldur's Dreams)
 Symphony No. 1 'Christmas''' (1958)

Vocal/Choral
 Basun for tenor voice and orchestra (1971)
 Telemarkin – Cantata for voice and orchestra
 The Turtle for mezzo-soprano and orchestra. Text from Steinbeck's The Grapes of WrathPiano
 Fifty Hardanger Tunes, Op. 150
 Four-part Inventions in Lydian, Dorian, and Phrygian, Op. 4
 Piano Sonata No. 29, Op. 129, 'Sonata Etere'
 Three-part Inventions in Lydian, Dorian, and Phrygian, Op. 3
 12 Two-part Inventions in Lydian, Dorian, and Phrygian, Op. 2 (1930)

Wind Band
 Sinfonia di Soffiatori (1974)
 Sinfonietta di Soffiatori (1962)

References

Primary sources
 Aksnes, Hallgjerd, Perspectives of Musical Meaning: A Study Based on Selected Works by Geirr Tveitt, (doctoral dissertation, University of Oslo, 2002)
 Emberland, Terje, Religion og rase. Nyhedenskap og nazisme i Norge 1933–1945 (Oslo: Humanist Forlag, 2003).
 Storaas, Reidar, Tonediktaren Geirr Tveitt: Songjen i Fossaduren (Det Norske Samlaget, Oslo, 1990)
 Storaas, Reidar, Geir Tveitt: Mellom triumf og tragedie (2008)
 Tveit, Tore, Geirr Tveitt: Nordmann og Europeer: Hans Forhold til Den Nasjonale Retning i 1930–årene'' (doctoral dissertation, University of Oslo, 1983)

Other sources
 Gallagher, David, 'A Hundred Hardanger Tunes, Op. 151: Suites Nos. 2 and 5,' sleeve notes for compact disc NAXOS 8.555770, 2002, 3 – 4.
 Gallagher David, 'Piano Concerto No. 4 "Aurora Borealis",' sleeve notes for compact disc NAXOS 8.555761, 2002, 2 – 4.
 Storaas, Reidar, 'Geirr Tveitt and Baldur,' sleeve notes for compact disc BIS CD-1337/1338 DIGITAL, 2003, 3 – 6.

External links
Geirr Tveitt website

1908 births
1981 deaths
Musicians from Bergen
Musicians from Kvam
20th-century classical composers
20th-century classical pianists
Ballet composers
Norwegian composers
Norwegian classical composers
Norwegian classical pianists
Norwegian opera composers
Norwegian male classical composers
Norwegian modern pagans
Adherents of Germanic neopaganism
Performers of modern pagan music
Norwegian male pianists
20th-century Norwegian male musicians